The Georgia Green Party (GGP) is an unregistered political party in the American state of Georgia. The party is not an affiliate of the Green Party US organization. The GGP has also been barred access from ballots multiple times, causing them to consider lawsuits.

In 2016, the Green Party of the United States advocated to have the GGP be registered by the Georgia General Assembly, though this was countered by the primarily Republican majority in the legislature. The GGP was disaffiliated from the national Green Party federation in 2021, due to the GGP adopting positions which were judged in opposition to the national party's stances in favor of transgender rights.

Transphobia controversy and disaffiliation 
The GGP has endorsed the Women Picket DC.  On July 26, 2021, the Georgia Green Party was removed from the federation of the Green Party US by the National Committee of the Green Party US for passing amendments in the state Party manifesto that the Green Party US's Accreditation Committee said violated the Green Party's values, specifically against transgender and sexual minority rights. The Georgia Green Party passed amendments without first having a vote through Party members that restricted the rights of transgender and gender non-conforming people, such as supporting bathroom bills and a ban on transgender people in sporting events. A complaint was filed by the Lavender Caucus (the LGBTQ+ Caucus) in November 2020. On July 26, 2021, the National Committee of the Green Party of the United States voted with an 88% majority to remove the Georgia Green Party.

See also 

 Green Party of the United States
 Green politics

References

Green Party of the United States
Politics of Georgia (U.S. state)
Political parties in Georgia (U.S. state)
Transphobia